Chess software comes in different forms. A chess playing program provides a graphical chessboard on which one can play a chess game against a computer. Such programs are available for personal computers, video game consoles, smartphones/tablet computers or mainframes/supercomputers. A chess engine generates moves, but is accessed via a command-line interface with no graphics. A dedicated chess computer has been purpose built solely to play chess. A graphical user interface (GUI) allows one to import and load an engine, and play against it. A chess database allows one to import, edit, and analyze a large archive of past games.

Chess-playing programs for personal computers

Chess engines
This list contains only chess engines for which Wikipedia articles exist yet and therefore is very incomplete. It does not reflect or imply current or historic play strength as this characteristic in itself usually does not warrant an entry on Wikipedia.

Chess graphical user interfaces

Chess-playing programs for video game consoles

Chess apps for phones/tablets

Chess computers
The following are special-purpose hardware/software combinations that are inextricably connected:

Programs for reading and editing chess databases
Chess Assistant
Chess Informant Expert
ChessBase
Shane's Chess Information Database

Chess-playing programs for mainframes/supercomputers
AlphaZero
Chess (Northwestern University)
CilkChess
Kaissa
Kotok-McCarthy
Mac Hack

Tiniest chess programs
1K ZX Chess
Microchess
Toledo Nanochess

See also

References

Video game lists by genre
Software
Lists of software